Telmatobius colanensis is a species of frog in the family Telmatobiidae. It is endemic to northern Peru and only known from its type locality on the Cordillera Colán, near La Peca, Amazonas Region.

T. colanensis is a riparian, semiaquatic frog living in rocky high-gradient streams in undisturbed cloud forest. It is present in the Cordillera de Colán National Sanctuary. Outside the reserve, habitat loss is a threat. Also chytridiomycosis is a serious risk.

References

colanensis
Endemic fauna of Peru
Amphibians of Peru
Taxonomy articles created by Polbot
Amphibians described in 1993